The Metro Manila Film Festival Award for Best Screenplay is an award presented annually by the Metropolitan Manila Development Authority (MMDA). It was first awarded at the 1st Metro Manila Film Festival ceremony, held in 1975; Luciano Carlos received the award for his script in Batu-Bato sa Langit and it is given in honor of a scriptwriter with best script while working within the film industry. Currently, nominees and winners are determined by Executive Committees, headed by the Metropolitan Manila Development Authority Chairman and key members of the film industry.

Winners and nominees

1970s

1980s

1990s

2000s

2010s

2020s

Multiple awards for Best Screenplay
Throughout the history of Metro Manila Film Festival (MMFF), there have been scriptwriters who received multiple Awards for Best Screenplay. As of 2015 (41st MMFF), 4 scriptwriters have received two or more Best Screenplay awards.

Notes

References

External links
IMDB: Metro Manila Film Festival
Official website of the Metro Manila Film Festival

Screenplay